The Las Vegas Concours d'Elegance is an automotive Concours d'Elegance event held annually at the Wynn in Las Vegas, Nevada.

History 
Concours d’Elegance arrived in Las Vegas in 2019 as the 40th sanctioned event to join the roster of Concours exhibitions and competitions around the globe. Founder and Chairman Stuart Sobek recognized not only that Las Vegas is a destination teeming with local and visiting fans of upscale classic and modern cars, the city’s dazzling architecture and reputation as the entertainment capital of the world also provide a fitting framework for the beauty of exceptional automobiles.

The Inaugural Las Vegas Concours d'Elegance was held on Saturday October 26, 2019 with 140 cars from around the World, at the DragonRidge Country Club in the affluent MacDonald Highlands.

The 2020 event was cancelled due to the COVID-19 pandemic.

The 2021 event was hosted at the Las Vegas Ballpark in Summerlin.

Since 2022 the event has been hosted at the Wynn Las Vegas and was sponsored by Louis XIII and the upcoming Formula 1 Las Vegas Grand Prix. The event was the largest with over 250 cars and the Grand Marshal was Jay Leno. Several corporate exhibitions from Rolls-Royce, Bugatti, Bentley, Ferrari, Koenigsegg, Pagani, Shelby, and McLaren were featured. The 35th anniversary of the Ferrari F40 was celebrated at the event. The 2023 event will be moved to November 11-12, 2023 to take place the week before the F1 Grand Prix.

Tour d'Elegance 
The day after the main Concours event many of the participating cars tour the Las Vegas Strip in a motorcade parade.

Winners

Trophy design 
The designs of the Best of Show and honorary individual trophies "The Helene Awards" are modeled after Helene Rother, the first woman to be an automotive designer at GM in 1943 after being hired by Harley Earl, and later an Automotive Hall of Fame inductee.

References

External links 

 Las Vegas Concours d'Elegance official website

Concours d'Elegance
Annual events in Nevada